The Principate is the name sometimes given to the first period of the Roman Empire from the beginning of the reign of Augustus in 27 BC to the end of the Crisis of the Third Century in AD 284, after which it evolved into the so-called Dominate.

The Principate is characterised by the reign of a single emperor (princeps) and an effort on the part of the early emperors, at least, to preserve the illusion of the formal continuance, in some aspects, of the Roman Republic.

Etymology and anticipations
'Principate' is etymologically derived from the Latin word princeps, meaning chief or first, and therefore represents the political regime dominated by such a political leader, whether or not he is formally head of state or head of government. This reflects the principate emperors' assertion that they were merely "first among equals" among the citizens of Rome.
Under the Republic, the princeps senatus, traditionally the oldest or most honoured member of the Senate, had the right to be heard first on any debate.
Scipio Aemilianus and his circle had fostered the (quasi-Platonic) idea that authority should be invested in the worthiest citizen (princeps), who would beneficently guide his compeers, an ideal of the patriot statesman later taken up by Cicero.

Duration
In a more limited and precise chronological sense, the term Principate is applied either to the entire Empire (in the sense of the post-Republican Roman state), or specifically to the earlier of the two phases of "Imperial" government in the ancient Roman Empire before Rome's military collapse in the West (fall of Rome) in 476 left the Byzantine Empire as sole heir.  This early, 'Principate' phase began when Augustus claimed auctoritas for himself as princeps; and continued (depending on the source) up to the rule of Commodus, of Maximinus Thrax, or of Diocletian. Afterwards, Imperial rule in the Empire is designated as the Dominate, which is subjectively more like an (absolute) monarchy while the earlier Principate is still more 'Republican'.

History

The title, in full, of princeps senatus / princeps civitatis ("first amongst the senators" / "first amongst the citizens") was first adopted by Octavian Caesar Augustus (27 BC–AD 14), the first Roman "emperor" who chose, like the assassinated Julius Caesar, not to reintroduce a legal monarchy. Augustus's purpose was probably to establish the political stability desperately needed after the exhausting civil wars by a de facto dictatorial regime within the constitutional framework of the Roman Republic – what Gibbon called "an absolute monarchy disguised by the forms of a commonwealth" – as a more acceptable alternative to, for example, the early Roman Kingdom.

Although dynastic pretences crept in from the start, formalizing this in a monarchic style remained politically perilous; and Octavian was undoubtedly correct to work through established Republican forms to consolidate his power. He began with the powers of a Roman consul, combined with those of a tribune of the plebs; later added the role of the censor and finally became pontifex maximus as well.

Tiberius too acquired his powers piecemeal, and was proud to emphasise his place as first citizen: "a good and healthful princeps, whom you have invested with such great discretionary power, ought to be the servant of the Senate, and often of the whole citizen body". Thereafter, however, the role of princeps became more institutionalised: as Dio Cassius put it, Caligula was "voted in a single day all the prerogatives which Augustus over so long a span of time had been voted gradually and piecemeal".

Nevertheless, under this "Principate stricto sensu", the political reality of autocratic rule by the Emperor was still scrupulously masked by forms and conventions of oligarchic self-rule inherited from the political period of the 'uncrowned' Roman Republic (509 BC–27 BC) under the motto Senatus Populusque Romanus ("The Senate and people of Rome") or SPQR. Initially, the theory implied the 'first citizen' had to earn his extraordinary position (de facto evolving to nearly absolute monarchy) by merit in the style that Augustus himself had gained the position of auctoritas.

Imperial propaganda developed a paternalistic ideology, presenting the princeps as the very incarnation of all virtues attributed to the ideal ruler (much like a Greek tyrannos earlier), such as clemency and justice, and military leadership, obliging the princeps to play this designated role within Roman society, as his political insurance as well as a moral duty. What specifically was expected of the princeps seems to have varied according to the times, and the observers:  Tiberius, who amassed a huge surplus for the city of Rome, was criticized as a miser, but Caligula was criticized for his lavish spending on games and spectacles.

Generally speaking, it was expected of the Emperor to be generous but not frivolous, not just as a good ruler but also with his personal fortune (as in the proverbial "bread and circuses" – panem et circenses) providing occasional public games, gladiators, horse races and artistic shows. Large distributions of food for the public and charitable institutions also served as popularity boosters, while the construction of public works provided paid employment for the poor.

Redefinition under Vespasian 
With the fall of the Julio-Claudian dynasty in AD 68, the principate became more formalised under the Emperor Vespasian from AD 69 onwards. The position of princeps became a distinct entity within the broader – formally still republican – Roman constitution. While many of the same cultural and political expectations remained, the civilian aspect of the Augustan ideal of the princeps gradually gave way to the military role of the imperator.  Rule was no longer a position (even notionally) extended on the basis of merit, or auctoritas, but on a firmer basis, allowing Vespasian and future emperors to designate their own heir without those heirs having to earn the position through years of success and public favor.

Under the Antonine dynasty, it was the norm for the Emperor to appoint a successful and politically promising individual as his successor. In modern historical analysis, this is treated by many authors as an "ideal" situation: the individual who was most capable was promoted to the position of princeps. Of the Antonine dynasty, Edward Gibbon famously wrote that this was the happiest and most productive period in human history, and credited the system of succession as the key factor.

Dominate 
The autocratic elements in the Principate tended to increase over time, with the style of dominus ("Lord", "Master", suggesting the citizens became servi, servants or slaves) gradually becoming current for the emperor.  There was however no clear constitutional turning point, with Septimius Severus and the Severan dynasty beginning to use the terminology of the Dominate in reference to the emperor, and the various emperors and their usurpers throughout the 3rd century appealing to the people as both military dominus and political princeps.

It was after the Crisis of the Third Century almost resulted in the Roman Empire's political collapse that Diocletian firmly consolidated the trend to autocracy. He replaced the one-headed principate with the Tetrarchy (c. AD 300, two Augusti ranking above two Caesares), in which the vestigial pretence of the old republican forms was largely abandoned. The title of princeps disappeared – like the territorial unity of the Empire – in favor of dominus; and new forms of pomp and awe were deliberately used in an attempt to insulate the emperor and the civil authority from the unbridled and mutinous soldiery of the mid-century.

The political role of the Senate went into final eclipse, no more being heard of the division by the Augustan Principate of the provinces between imperial provinces and senatorial provinces. Lawyers developed a theory of the total delegation of authority into the hands of the emperor, and the Dominate developed more and more, especially in the Eastern Roman Empire, where the subjects, and even diplomatic allies, could be termed servus or the corresponding Greek term doulos ("servant/slave") so as to express the exalted position of the Emperor as second only to God, and on earth to none.

See also
Constitution of the Late Roman Empire

References

Sources
 Alston, Richard. 1998. Aspects of Roman History. AD 14–117. London: Routledge. 
 Aparicio Pérez, Antonio. 2009. “Taxation in Times of the Principate.” Gerión 27:1: 207-217.
 Bleicken, Jochen. 1978. Prinzipat und Dominat. Gedanken zur Periodisierung der römischen Kaiserzeit. Wiesbaden: Fr. Stein.
 Flaig, Egon. 2011. “The Transition from Republic to Principate: Loss of Legitimacy, Revolution, and Acceptance.” In The Roman Empire in Context: Historical and Comparative Perspectives, Edited by Jóhann Páll Arnason and Kurt A. Raaflaub. Ancient World, 67-84. Chichester: Wiley-Blackwell.
 Gallia, Andrew B. 2012. Remembering the Roman Republic: Culture, Politics and History under the Principate.   Cambridge; New York: Cambridge University Press.
 Gibson, A. G. G., ed. 2013. The Julio-Claudian Succession: Reality and Perception of the Augustan model. Mnemosyne. Supplements; 349. Leiden: Brill.
 Harlow, Mary and Laurence, Ray. 2017. “Augustus Senex: Old Age and the Remaking of the Principate.” Greece and Rome 64.2: 115-131.
 Kousser, Rachel Meredith. 2005. “From Conquest to Civilization: The Rhetoric of Imperialism in the Early Principate.” In A Tall Order: Writing the Social History of the Ancient World: Essays in Honor of William V. Harris, Edited by Jean-Jacques Aubert and Zsuzsanna Várhelyi. Beiträge zur Altertumskunde; 216, 185-202. München: Saur.
 Melounová, Markéta. 2012. “Trials with Religious and Political Charges from the Principate to the Dominate.” Series archaeologica et classica 17.2: 117-130.
 Raaflaub, Kurt A, Mark Toher, and G. W Bowersock. 1990. Between Republic and Empire: Interpretations of Augustus and His Principate. Berkeley: University of California Press.
 Williams, Kathryn Frances. 2009. “Tacitus' Germanicus and the Principate.” Latomus 68.1: 117-130.

External links

Government of the Roman Empire